"Dino" Don Lessem (born 1951) is a writer of more than 50 popular science books, specializing in dinosaurs. He was the founder of the Dinosaur Society and the Jurassic Foundation, which collectively have raised millions of dollars for dinosaur research. He is the CEO and founder of Dino Don, Inc., an animatronics company specializing in dinosaurs, dragons, and sea creatures.

Career

After a bachelor's degree in art history at  Brandeis University and a master's in animal behavior from the University of Massachusetts Boston, Lessem began his writing career as a researcher for the Smithsonian Center for Short-Lived Phenomena. For more than a decade he was a science journalist specializing in conservation issues for the Boston Globe and a contributor to Life, The New York Times, and Smithsonian Magazine.

Lessem's professional interest in dinosaurs developed while he was a Knight Journalism Fellow at MIT in 1988. He wrote his first book, Kings of Creation, in 1990, as a survey of current worldwide paleontology research.

Lessem was an advisor to Jurassic Park, Dinosaur, and Disney's Animal Kingdom, as well as their respective theme park attractions. He has written and hosted Discovery Channel and NOVA documentaries on dinosaurs and is a television and radio commentator on paleontology. The sauropodomorph dinosaur Lessemsaurus is named after him.

Mr. Lessem directed the excavation and reconstruction of the largest plant-eating dinosaur, the 110-foot long Argentinosaurus, and the largest carnivorous dinosaur, the 45 foot-long Giganotosaurus from Patagonia, in collaboration with Dr. Rodolfo Coria of the Museo Carmen Funes in Plaza Huincul, Argentina.

Lessem's first traveling exhibition company, Exhibits Rex, has created several of the largest international travelling museum exhibitions of dinosaurs, including Jurassic Park, The Lost World, and Chinasaurs, in addition to an exhibition of the treasures of Genghis Khan. Mr. Lessem's The Real Genghis Khan exhibition has toured major museums in North America and Asia since 2009. Celebrating the neglected civilizing influence of Genghis Khan and curated by Smithsonian archaeologists, the exhibition has been seen by nearly two million visitors. The exhibition blends live musical performance with role-playing activities, and the largest collection of 13th century Mongolian artifacts ever toured. It has been viewed by nearly two million museum-goers.

Mr. Lessem's company Dino Don, Inc. began constructing the world's most accurate full-sized robotic dinosaurs in 2017 for zoos and museums worldwide. In April 2019 Lessem opened his Dinosaur Safari exhibition at New York's Bronx Zoo with more than 40 dinosaurs up to 60 feet in length, the largest zoo robotic exhibition in North America. In July 2020 at the Brookfield Zoo in Chicago, the Dinos Everywhere! exhibit featured Lessem's creation of the world's largest anatomically correct dinosaur, a 120-foot Argentinosaurus. Other venues to display Dino Don, Inc. dinosaurs include The Jacksonville Zoo, Philadelphia Zoo, Columbus Zoo, San Antonio Zoo, Copenhagen Zoo, Edinburgh Zoo, and Leipzig Zoo.

Lessem has also authored children's books on extinct animals, endangered species, the Amazon rainforest and the "Iceman". Via his monthly column in Highlights Magazine for a decade, "Dino" Don answered more than 10,000 letters from children. He created the non-profit children's newspaper Dino Times, which ran from 1981 to 1984. At the behest of Universal Studios, 1.3 million copies of a special edition of Dino Times were distributed at the opening of Jurassic Park.

Lessem is also the author of several humorous books including Aerphobics, Death by Roller Disco, How to Flatten Your Nose, and The Worst of Everything. His humorous essays have appeared in Punch, The New York Times and The Atlantic.

Lessem was the creator of Earth Quest Adventures, a theme park and resort planned for East Montgomery County, west of Houston, in 2008. He is also the initial designer of a wetlands attraction in Daqing, China and an paleontology-themed attraction, Gondwana: Das Praehistorium, in Reden, Germany.

Mr. Lessem has been profiled on The Today Show, in People, Success, Entrepreneur, and Inc. Magazines. He has frequently appeared as a commentator on dinosaurs for Good Morning America, The Today Show, CBS Morning News, and PBS Science Friday and All Things Considered.

Mr. Lessem gained worldwide notoriety in 2019 for deploying his "Dumping Trump" robot at anti-Trump protests in London and Washington DC. The 16 foot-high sculpture of Trump sitting on a golden toilet tweets while saying ""No Collusion" "Stable Genius,"  and "Fake News." It toured the eastern United States in October, 2020 as the "Trump Death Mobile" with a banner "Vote for Me and die: 200,000 People Have."  Lessem is the author of a quote quiz book comparing Trump to dictators and fictional villains, entitled "Who Said It; Trump Or This Other Shmuck." The website TheDumpingTrumpRobot.com detailed the whereabouts of the robot.

"The Dinosaur Factory", a documentary series involving Lessem, will air in the Fall of 2022.

Personal life
Lessem resides in Media, Pennsylvania. His wife, Valerie Jones, is a non-profit development consultant. His daughters, Rebecca Lessem and Erica Lessem, are respectively an energy company executive and a public health specialist in tuberculosis, both residing in New York.

Shark Tank Appearance 
Don Lessem and his wife appeared on the Season 12 finale of Shark Tank on May 21, 2021to pitch their business Dino Don Inc.. They made a deal with Mark Cuban for a $500,000 investment in exchange for a 25% stake in the company.

See also
 Dump Trump (statue)

References

External links
Visiting authors biography (archive)
Don Lessem biography

American paleontologists
1951 births
Living people
People from Media, Pennsylvania